KNOX (1310 AM, "News Radio 1310 & 107.9 KNOX") is a radio station broadcasting a news/talk format serving Grand Forks, North Dakota. The station is owned by Leighton Broadcasting.  KNOX also rebroadcasts on translators K300BG 107.9 FM and K277DN 103.3 FM in Grand Forks.

The station broadcasts ABC News updates. The station broadcasts local high school hockey, football, and basketball games on occasion, and Minnesota Timberwolves basketball, Minnesota Wild hockey, and Minnesota Twins baseball games.

History

KNOX signed on in 1949 with a full service format blending music, news, talk, and radio dramas. It later became a Top 40 station, and changed to a mainly News/Talk format in the 1980s.  The lineup of local on-air hosts has undergone several changes since then and has included names like Jim Bollman, Scott Hennen, and Jarrod Thomas.

News Talk 1310 KNOX's local news team consists of Doug Barrett and Pat Sweeney.

On January 11, 2012, KNOX began broadcasting on FM translator K300BG 107.9 FM in Grand Forks. 107.9 had been broadcasting KGFK AM 1590, which moved to 95.7 FM as it has a stronger signal in Grand Forks. In May 2021, second FM translator K277DN 103.3 FM in Grand Forks signed on for better rural coverage from the KZLT/KZGF transmitter tower, including coverage of Crookston, while K300BG 107.9 FM continues to cover the immediate Grand Forks–East Grand Forks area. K277DN 103.3 FM also has stronger coverage than K300BG 107.9 FM in some parts of Grand Forks–East Grand Forks due to less adjacent channel interference from full-power KJKJ/107.5 "KJ108" and co-channel interference from Fargo's KPFX "107.9 The Fox".

The current local lineup which has been fairly consistent since March 2014 from 6:00 am to 6:00 pm includes "Denny and Gina in the Morning" from 6a – 9a,  "The Jarrod Thomas Show" from 9a – Noon, "The Ryan Cunningham Show" from Noon – 3p, and "The Schmidt Show" from 3p – 6p.

Awards
The station was a finalist for the 2008 Crystal Radio Award for Excellence in Community Service awarded by the National Association of Broadcasters.

Translators
KNOX broadcasts on the following FM translators:

References

External links

Leighton Broadcasting
FCC History Cards for KNOX

NOX
News and talk radio stations in the United States
Radio stations established in 1949
1949 establishments in North Dakota